Session: Skate Sim is a sports video game developed by Montreal independent developer Crea-ture Studios (stylized as creā-ture Studios Inc.) for Microsoft Windows, Nintendo Switch, PlayStation 4, PlayStation 5, Xbox One and Xbox Series X/S. The game was considered by many as the spiritual successor to the Skate series.

Gameplay
Session is an open-ended video game, promised to exclude a scoring system and include a different control scheme. The game is presented in the style of a fish-eye lens from a mini DV format camera.

Development
Session: Skate Sim was conceived in 2015 under two working titles, Project: Session, followed by Session. Between then and the two years that followed, many fans and outlets discussed a major need for a new skateboarding game. Developer Marc-Andre Houde described the inspiration for the game as a passion for the sport. Houde also stated the game would be developed using Unreal Engine 4. Originally, the team had planned to build the game in Unity, but the team was attracted to Unreal's multiplayer capabilities.

In early November 2017, Crea-ture Studios released a free demo for Session. A trailer released by the team shows several clips of the demo, which is set in an unnamed jail and allows players to freely skate in a closed skatepark. Later that month, the team opened the project on Kickstarter, which successfully reached its initial goal after three days. A trailer for Session was unveiled during the Microsoft conference at E3 2018. Session was released on Steam Early Access on 17 September 2019, and for Xbox Game Preview on 17 June 2020. On 18 January 2021, it was announced that Nacon would be publishing Session. In July 2021, it was announced that the game would be fully releasing for Microsoft Windows, PlayStation 4, PlayStation 5, Xbox One and Xbox Series X/S. Nearly a year later, it was announced that a full release would be available on 22 September 2022. In February 2022, the game was renamed from Session to Session: Skate Sim. On 22 January 2023, a Nintendo Switch version was announced for a 16 March 2023 release.

Reception

Session: Skate Sim received "mixed or average" reviews, according to review aggregator Metacritic.

References

External links
 and Presskit

2022 video games
Nacon games
Early access video games
Kickstarter-funded video games
Nintendo Switch games
PlayStation 4 games
PlayStation 5 games
Single-player video games
Skateboarding video games
Unreal Engine games
Video games developed in Canada
Windows games
Xbox One games
Xbox Series X and Series S games